Walter Owen Jenkins (9 January 1897 – 19 March 1978) was an Australian rules footballer who played with South Melbourne in the Victorian Football League (VFL).

Notes

External links 

1897 births
1978 deaths
Australian rules footballers from Victoria (Australia)
Sydney Swans players